Clathurella salarium is a species of sea snail, a marine gastropod mollusk in the family Clathurellidae. The taxonomic validity of this species is uncertain.

Description
The shell grows to a length of 19 mm.

Distribution
This species occurs in the Atlantic Ocean along the Cape Verde Islands.

References

 Rolán E., 2005. Malacological Fauna From The Cape Verde Archipelago. Part 1, Polyplacophora and Gastropoda

External links
 Locard A. (1897-1898). Expéditions scientifiques du Travailleur et du Talisman pendant les années 1880, 1881, 1882 et 1883. Mollusques testacés. Paris, Masson. vol. 1 [1897, p. 1-516 pl. 1-22; vol. 2 [1898], p. 1-515, pl. 1-18]

salarium
Gastropods described in 1897
Gastropods of Cape Verde